Mao Ni (born 1977) is a Chinese author of xianxia novels. His most famous work is the web novel, Ze Tian Ji (Way of Choices) which has been adapted into an action TV drama, Fighter of the Destiny. In 2017, it was placed first on the Chinese social media site Weibo's poll of most-anticipated TV dramas of 2017. His web novel Jiang Ye (Nightfall) was adapted into the TV series Ever Night. His novels are published on the Webnovel platform, an English-language website and mobile platform launched by China Literature, Chinas largest online publishing company.

Web novels 
 Zhuque Ji (2005–2007)
 Joy of Life (2007–2009)
 The Outcast (2009–2011)
 Nightfall (2011–2014)
 Way of Choices (2014–2017)
 The Path Toward Heaven (2017–2020)

Other media 
 Way of Choices (anime TV series, 2015)
 Fighter of the Destiny (live action TV series, 2017)
 Ever Night (live action TV series, 2018)
 Joy of Life (live action TV series, 2019)

Awards

Won 

 Sina 4th Original Contest Fantasy Martial Arts Awards Final Evaluation List, First Place 2015 (Suzaku)
 20 Years of Chinese Network Literature 20 Years, First Place 2018 (The Outcast)
 The First Internet Literature Biennial Awards, First Place 2015 (Nightfall)

Nominated 
 West Lake Type Biennial Award Fantasy Martial Arts Awards Final Evaluation List, First Place 2015 (Suzaku)
 Global Chinese Science Fiction Nebula Awards, Most popular mobile phone reader, Second Place 2014 (The Outcast)

References

External links 

 Personal Profile on Qidian.com.

1977 births
Living people
21st-century Chinese novelists
Chinese fantasy writers
Writers from Hubei
People from Yichang